Under the patronage of Prince Albert II of Monaco the 17th annual World Music Awards were conducted at the Kodak Theatre in Hollywood, California on August 31, 2005.  This is only the second time that the awards show has been held outside of Monaco.  The five-hour awards show was co-hosted by Carmen Electra and Desperate Housewives James Denton.  The awards are based solely on record sales certified by the International Federation of the Phonographic Industry, a London-based trade group that represents the major record labels.  Proceeds are donated to the Prince's favorite charity: the Monaco Aide and Presence Foundation.  Usher, Kenny "Babyface" Edmonds, Amerie, Rihanna, and Teairra Marí paid tribute to Destiny's Child, who received an award for being the best-selling female group of all time.  Patti LaBelle dedicated her performance of  "I'll Stand By You" to the victims of Hurricane Katrina as did Stevie Wonder and Kid Rock when they closed the show at 2am with a duet of "Living for the City".  
Other performers included: 50 Cent, Amerie, Biagio Antonacci, Carlos Santana, Ciara, Delta Goodrem, Destiny's Child, Elissa. Eminem, Fantasia Barrino, Jay-Z, Kelly Clarkson, Mariah Carey, Michelle Branch, Philip Kirkorov, Ricky Martin, Rob Thomas, Shakira and Snoop Dogg.  The show was broadcast in the United States by the American Broadcasting Company (ABC) on September 13, 2005.

World Diamond Award

The Diamond Award honors those recording-artists who have sold over 100 million albums during their career. Bon JoviWinners

All Time
World's Best-Selling Female Group of All Time: Destiny's ChildWorld's Best-Selling Touring Band of All Time: The Rolling StonesEntertainers of the Year
Female Entertainer of the Year: Mariah CareyMale Entertainer of the Year: 2FaceNew
World's Best-Selling New Female Artist: Gwen StefaniWorld's Best-Selling New Group: The KillersWorld's Best-Selling New Male Artist: The GamePop
World's Best-Selling Female Pop Artist: Mariah CareyWorld's Best-Selling Male Pop Artist: 50 CentWorld's Best-Selling Pop Group: Destiny's ChildPop Rock
World's Best-Selling Pop Rock Artist: EminemRap Hip-Hop
World's Best-Selling Rap Hip-Hop Artist: EminemRock
World's Best-Selling Rock Group: U2R&B
World's Best-Selling R&B Artist: Mariah Carey 
World's Best-Selling R&B Group: Destiny's ChildRegional Awards
Best-Selling American Artist: Mariah CareyBest-Selling Australian Artist: Delta GoodremBest-Selling Canadian Artist: Michael BubléBest-Selling Dutch Artist: Within TemptationBest-Selling English Artist: ColdplayBest-Selling French Artist: RaphaelBest-Selling German Artist: RammsteinBest-Selling Greek Artist: Sakis RouvasBest-Selling Italian Artist: Biagio AntonacciBest-Selling Middle Eastern Artist: ElissaBest-Selling Russian Artist: Philip KirkorovBest-Selling Spanish Artist: AlejandroBest-Selling Swiss Artist: DJ BoboBest-Selling Korean Artist:BoA'

Records
Mariah Carey won four awards: (1) *Best-Selling R&B Artist, (2) *Best-Selling Pop Female Artist, (3) Female Entertainer of the Year and (4) American Artist
Destiny's Child won three awards: (1) *Best-Selling Pop Group, (2) *Best-Selling R&B Group and (3) *Best-Selling Female Group of All Time.

References

World Music Awards, 2005
Lists of World Music Award winners
World